Dino Mikanović (born 7 May 1994) is a Croatian professional footballer who plays as a right-back for HNK Hajduk Split in the Croatian First League.

Club career
Born in Nova Gradiška but hailing from the village of Podvrško, Mikanović started his youth career at the nearby NK Mladost Cernik. He joined the U17 team of NK Osijek in 2009, spending the next three seasons there before moving to HNK Hajduk Split on a free transfer, as he was not offered a contract after he turned 18. For this club has debuted against Slaven Belupo on 10 April 2013.

He made his debut for Hajduk in his one and only appearance in the 2012–13 season, coming on in the 85th minute against Slaven Belupo. The next season Dino was more prominent in the first team at Hajduk, making 16 appearances in all competitions, scoring his first goal in a 1–1 draw against NK Zadar and assisting a further three goals.

On 15 July 2015, he signed on a four-year contract with AGF Aarhus of the Danish Superliga.

On 19 February 2019, Mikanović signed a two-year contract with FC Kairat.

On 28 January 2022, HNK Hajduk Split announced the return of Mikanović, on a contract until the summer of 2024.

Career statistics

Club

Honours  
Hajduk Split 
 Croatian Football Cup: 2012–13, 2021–22

Kairat Almaty 
 Kazakhstan Premier League: 2020

References

External links
 

1994 births
Living people
People from Nova Gradiška
Association football fullbacks
Croatian footballers
Croatia youth international footballers
Croatia under-21 international footballers
HNK Hajduk Split players
HNK Hajduk Split II players
Aarhus Gymnastikforening players
FC Kairat players
Croatian Football League players
Danish Superliga players
Kazakhstan Premier League players
Croatian expatriate footballers
Croatian expatriate sportspeople in Denmark
Expatriate men's footballers in Denmark
Croatian expatriate sportspeople in Kazakhstan
Expatriate footballers in Kazakhstan